On November 19, 2020, João Alberto Silveira Freitas, a 40-year-old black man, died in Porto Alegre, Brazil, after being beaten by security guards at a Carrefour unit in Passo d'Areia neighborhood.

The killing triggered protests across the entire country, scheduled for the day after, November 20, Black Awareness Day.

Victim and suspects

João Alberto Freitas

João Alberto Silveira Freitas (aged 40) was born and raised in Humaitá neighborhood, Porto Alegre. He had four children: the first, a woman, was from his first relationship and the last three from a second marriage. He lived with Milena in a stable union and the two were planning to get married.

Giovane Gaspar da Silva

Giovane Gaspar da Silva, aged 24 at the time, was one of the security guards arrested for the attack. He was a temporary military police officer, working for Military Brigade of Rio Grande do Sul since 2018 and allegedly did not have license to work as a private security guard.

Magno Braz Borges

Magno Braz Borges, aged 30 at the time, was another security guard arrested for the attack. He was licensed to work as security guard but his professional bond with Vector, the company responsible for security in the Carrefour unit, was not in database records of Federal Police of Brazil, the agency in charge of regulating the profession.

Adriana Alves Dutra

Adriana Alves Dutra was a Carrefour Passo d'Areia unit employee. During the occurrence, she was allegedly seen standing beside the men on the ground and seemed to give orders through the radio. Adriana is also reportedly to have threatened people who was filming the action.

References

Carrefour
2020 in Brazil
Protests in Brazil
November 2020 events in Brazil
2020 crimes in Brazil